The Balta Mică a Brăilei Natural Park is a protected area (natural park category V IUCN) which is situated in Romania, in Brăila County, on the administrative territory of communes Berteștii de Jos, Chiscani, Gropeni, Mărașu and Stăncuța.

Location 
The Natural Park is located in the inferior course of the Danube, between the Brăila Plain (Wallachian Plain) and Great Brăila Island, based on the Small Brăila Island, in the south-eastern part of country.

Description 
Balta Mică a Brăilei Natural Park an area of 17.529 ha was declared protected area by the Law Number 5 of March 6, 2000 (published in Romanian Official Paper Number 152 of March 12, 2000) and is a wetland of international importance especially a waterfowl habitat (aquatic ecosystem) and terrestrial species.

Fauna 
Species of fish: Black Sea shad (Alosa pontica), northern pike (Esox lucius), zander (Stizostedion lucioperca), wels catfish (Silurus glanis) or common carp (Cyprinus carpio).

Species of birds: red-breasted goose (Branta ruficollis), Dalmatian pelican (Pelecanus criptus), purple heron (Ardea purpurea), pygmy cormorant (Phalacrocorax pygmeus), squacco heron (Ardeola ralloides), black stork (Ciconia nigra), ferruginous duck (Aythya nyroca), whooper swan (Cygnus cygnus).

Access 
 European route E60 București – Moviliţa – Urziceni – National road DN2A  Slobozia – Țăndărei – Giurgeni – bridge Giurgeni-Vadu Oii

References 

Protected areas of Romania
Tourist attractions in Brăila County
Protected areas established in 2000
Geography of Brăila County
Important Bird Areas of Romania